The Mercedes-Benz M117 is an OHC (overhead cam), 2 valve per cylinder V8 engine made in several versions by Mercedes-Benz between 1971 and 1992.

Applications

280 SE, SEL 4.5 (W108)
300 SEL 4.5 (W109)
420 SEL (W126)
450 SE, SEL (W116)
450 SL, SLC (R107 / C107)
450 SLC 5.0 (C107)
500 GE (W463)
500 SE, SEL, SEC (W / V / C126)
500 SL, SLC (R107 / C107)
560 SE, SEL, SEC (W / V / C126)
560 SL (R107)

Racing
Sauber C8
Sauber C9

Other Manufacturers
Isdera Autobahnkurier AK116i
Isdera Erator GTE
Isdera Imperator 108i
Lotec C1000 (with two turbochargers)
Monteverdi Tiara
Zender Vision 3

References

Notes

Bibliography

 

M117
World Sportscar Championship engines
V8 engines